Tim Spurgeon (born December 13, 1960) is an American professional stock car racing driver. He competes part-time in the ARCA Menards Series West, driving the No. 86 Toyota Camry for his family-owned team Spurgeon Motorsports.

Racing career

ARCA Menards Series West

Spurgeon made his ARCA Menards Series debut in 2010 (then the NASCAR K&N Pro Series West) at the Utah Motorsports Campus. He finished 20th. Spurgeon returned to the series in 2012 running at Sonoma and Portland. In 2013, 2014, and 2015, Spurgeon ran once race each, all at Sonoma. His best finish was 11th, in 2013. In 2016, Spurgeon ran 3 races, with one coming at Sonoma and two at Utah Motorsports Campus. In the first race at Utah, Spurgeon got his first career top-ten finish, 8th. Spurgeon ran one race in 2017 at Sonoma, finishing 13th. In 2018, Spurgeon ran at the Las Vegas Motor Speedway Dirt Track, his first ever oval race. However, he failed to finish due to an electrical issue. In 2019, he returned to Las Vegas and Sonoma, finishing 11th at Sonoma. Spurgeon ran two races in 2021 at Sonoma and Portland, finishing 15th and 6th respectively. In 2022, Spurgeon ran the season-opening race at Phoenix Raceway, his first start on a paved oval. He finished 19th.

ARCA Menards Series
Spurgeon ran the 2022 General Tire 150, due to it being a combination race with the ARCA Menards Series West.

Motorsports career results

ARCA Menards Series

ARCA Menards Series West

References

External links 

1960 births
Living people
ARCA Menards Series drivers
NASCAR drivers
Racing drivers from California